Jacobus en Corneel is a Flemish children's slapstick series from the 1980s featuring the exploits of two handymen. It was originally broadcast between 1982 and 1984 on BRT (nowadays the VRT) every Tuesday and Friday around 18.20 in the evening.

Concept
Jacobus is tall and quite serious; Corneel is short and jolly but clumsy. They're housemates unless they're  called to fix something up. Both men wear caps and blue overalls over a white shirt. They travel by tandem bicycle.

The outdoor shots were done in the Pajottenland, while studio shots were made in Bonheiden. Rather than featuring dialogue, the episodes were narrated by a voice-over. In terms of personalities and comedy, Jacobus and Corneel were comparable to Laurel & Hardy and the Dutch 1970s duo Peppi & Kokki.

Cast
 Jacobus: Jappe Claes
 Corneel: Jos Kennis
 Narrator: Nolle Versyp.
 Female roles: Marleen Merckx

Adaptations

In 1985 a comic book was made based on the TV show. It was drawn by Luc Morjeau and Yaack.

Jaak Lamoen also published a children's novel about the characters.

Aftermath

Actor Jos Kennis died on July 15, 2009.

Sources

External links
 IMDB page

Flemish television shows
Belgian children's television shows
Belgian comedy television shows
1984 Belgian television series debuts
1985 Belgian television series endings
Television duos
Fictional characters from Flanders
Fictional mechanics
Fictional plumbers
Fictional construction workers
Comedy television characters
Television shows set in Belgium
Television shows adapted into novels
Television shows adapted into comics
Eén original programming